Aimee Murch (born June 1983 in Sydney) is an Australian softball player.  She plays for the Australian Capital Territory (ACT) in national competitions, and for a local ACT club.  She plays for the Australia women's national softball team. She is trying to earn a spot on the roster that will allow her to compete at the 2012 ISF XIII Women's World Championships.  She plays professional softball in Italy for Nuoro. She is currently employed by the Queensland Department of Education.

Personal
Murch was born in June 1983 in Sydney. She is from the Australian Capital Territory.

Softball

Murch is a pitcher. She played in the 8–0 loss to the United States.

Murch plays for the Australian Capital Territory team in the national competition. In 2009, she competed in the Gilleys Shield and was named the Best Pitcher. She was a member of the team in 2011. She also plays club softball in the territory. In 2011, she was playing club softball for Sutherland in the ACT women's fast-pitch competition.  In October, she helped her team beat the Boomerangs who had the returning international Clare Warwick on their side.

University team
Murch played university softball in the United States for Lynn University. In 2005, she was named to the First Team All-American.  She was also named the Female Athlete of the Year by the Sunshine State Conference, and was named the Most Valuable Player at the DII National Championship.  In 2005 and 2006, she was named the athlete of the year by her university.  Her university inducted her into their hall of fame in 2010, making her the first softball player to be inducted. While pitching for the university, she held several school records.  These records include most strikeouts in a game at 22, having an ERA of 0.45, the most wins at 39, pitching the most complete games with 38, having the most shutouts with 21 and having the most strikeouts during a single season with a total of 428 for a season.  She finished her university career with an ERA of 0.55, a total of 62 wins, having pitched 69 complete games, had 37 shutouts and striking out 737 batters.

National team
Murch plays for the Australia women's national softball team. She made her national team debut and first earned a softball scholarship at the Australian Institute of Sport in 2009 and held on to both in 2010. In March 2011, the Australian side was selected that would represent the country during international competitions in 2011.  She was one of four players from the Australian Capital Territory to gain selection. In 2011, she was a member of the Australian side that competed at the World Cup of Softball. She played in the 8–0 loss to the United States. She is a member of the 2012 Australia women's national softball team and is trying to secure a spot on the team that will allow her to compete at the 2012 ISF XIII Women's World Championships . The removal of softball from the Olympic programme in 2012 and 2016 has had a negative impact on her ability to compete internationally as Softball Australia received less funding from the government, which meant it was harder to fund travel for her and other national team members to attend top-level international competitions.

Professional softball
Murch first played professional softball in 2006 for an Italian team.  She stayed with them for the 2006, 2007 and 2008 season.  While she was with the team, they won the Italian Championship, Italian Cup and European Cup. She played for the Dutch side Terravogels in 2009 where she was named the Best Pitcher in the Dutch Softball League. With Terravogels, she won a European Cup. She played softball for an Italian professional team in 2011. She signed with an Italian Nuoro side during the 2011/2012 off season. Previously, she had played for Italian sides from Legnano and LaLoggia. She departed from Australia in late March 2012 to join her Italian side.

References

Living people
Australian softball players
1983 births